Angel Arocha Guillen (23 June 1907 – 2 September 1938), commonly known as Arocha, was a Spanish footballer who played as a forward. Arocha began his career with CD Tenerife then he played for FC Barcelona between 1927 and 1933.

Arocha scored 203 goals in 210 matches played with FC Barcelona.

After playing for Barça he moved to Atlético de Aviación. He died in Balaguer during the Spanish Civil War.

Honours
FC Barcelona
La Liga (1): 1929
Copa del Rey (1): 1928

External links
 
 Spain stats at BDFutbol
  Ángel Arocha at CD Tenerife.es  (in Spanish)

1907 births
1938 deaths
Spanish footballers
Footballers from the Canary Islands
CD Tenerife players
FC Barcelona players
Atlético Madrid footballers
La Liga players
Spain international footballers
People killed in the Spanish Civil War
Association football forwards
Catalonia international guest footballers
People from Tenerife
Sportspeople from the Province of Santa Cruz de Tenerife